The 1938–39 Nationalliga A season was the second season of the Nationalliga A, the top level of ice hockey in Switzerland. Six teams participated in the league, and HC Davos won the championship.

Standings

External links
 Championnat de Suisse 1938/39

National League (ice hockey) seasons
Swiss
1938–39 in Swiss ice hockey